Jesse David Bright (December 18, 1812 – May 20, 1875) was the ninth Lieutenant Governor of Indiana and U.S. Senator from Indiana who served as President pro tempore of the Senate on three occasions. He was the only senator from a Northern state to be expelled for being a Confederate sympathizer. As a leading Copperhead he opposed the Civil War.  He was frequently in competition with Governor Joseph A. Wright, the leader of the state's Republican Party.

Early life and career
Bright was born into a German family in Norwich, New York, which moved to Madison, Indiana, in 1820. Bright attended public schools as a child. He studied law and was admitted to the bar in 1831, commencing practice in Madison. He was elected a judge of the probate court of Jefferson County, Indiana, in 1834, was a United States Marshal for the district of Indiana from 1840 to 1841 and served in the Indiana Senate from 1841 to 1843. In 1842, he was elected Lieutenant Governor of Indiana and served as such from 1843 to 1845.

U.S. Senate
Bright was elected as a Democrat to the United States Senate in 1844, and was reelected in 1850 and 1856, serving from 1845 to 1862. He was chairman of the Committee on Enrolled Bills from 1845 to 1847, of the Committee on Public Buildings from 1845 to 1847, of the Committee on Revolutionary Claims from 1847 to 1849, of the Committee on Roads and Canals from 1849 to 1855 and of the Committee on Public Buildings and Grounds from 1857 to 1861. He was also President pro tempore of the Senate from 1854 to 1856, 1856 to 1857, and in 1860. As such, he was first in the presidential line of succession in the first two terms due to the death of Vice President William R. King in April 1853.

In the Senate, Bright was not known as a great orator but was very able in committee work. One enemy of his was Illinois Senator Stephen A. Douglas after he voted against keeping Bright in the Senate. He was, however, a very close friend and confidant of William Hayden English, a U.S. Representative from Indiana. In 1857, President James Buchanan offered him the post of Secretary of State, but he declined.

In the beginning of 1862, the Senate of the 37th Congress, which was composed of twenty-nine Republicans and ten Democrats, voted to expel him for acknowledging Jefferson Davis as President of the Confederate States and for facilitating the sale of arms to the Confederacy. The issue was brought up when Minnesota Senator Morton S. Wilkinson introduced the Senate to a letter dated March 1, 1861, written to Davis and signed by Bright, involving firearm trades. The letter was found on a captured gun trader crossing the Confederate border during the First Battle of Bull Run.

He was the fourteenth senator expelled from Congress during the Civil War and was (as of 2022) the last senator ever to be expelled. Soon after his expulsion from the Senate, Union authorities confiscated his property in Port Fulton, Indiana, which became Jefferson General Hospital, the third-largest hospital during the Civil War. He was an unsuccessful candidate in filling the vacancy caused by his own expulsion in 1863. Bright's longtime intra-party rival, Envoy to Prussia and War Democrat Joseph A. Wright, succeeded him in the Senate.

Later life and career
After losing his home in Indiana, Bright moved to Covington, Kentucky. He was a member of the Kentucky House of Representatives from 1867 to 1871, was a presidential elector on the Democratic ticket from Kentucky in the 1868 presidential election, and was president of the Raymond City Coal Company from 1871 to 1875. He moved to Baltimore, Maryland, in 1874 and died there on May 20, 1875. He was interred in Green Mount Cemetery in Baltimore.

See also
List of United States senators expelled or censured

References

Further reading

External links
 Retrieved on 2009-5-12
The Expulsion of Senator Jesse Bright
Jesse D. Bright: Biographical and Historical Sketches of Early Indiana

|-

|-

|-

|-

|-

|-

1812 births
1875 deaths
1868 United States presidential electors
19th-century American businesspeople
19th-century American judges
19th-century American lawyers
American anti-war activists
Burials at Green Mount Cemetery
Copperheads (politics)
Democratic Party United States senators from Indiana
Expelled United States senators
Indiana lawyers
Indiana state court judges
Democratic Party Indiana state senators
Lieutenant Governors of Indiana
Members of the Kentucky House of Representatives
People from Norwich, New York
People of Indiana in the American Civil War
Presidents pro tempore of the United States Senate
United States Marshals